Ionela Târlea (during marriage Târlea-Manolache; born 9 February 1976) is a former track and field athlete, competing internationally for Romania. She won the silver medal in the 400 m hurdles at the 2004 Summer Olympics. At the same games in Athens, Greece, Târlea helped the Romanian national team to sixth place in the 4 × 400 m relay.

She gained recognition in top international competitions as early as 1996 at the Atlanta Olympics, when she came seventh in the 400 m hurdles event. In 1999 at the World Indoor Athletics Championships she won the gold medal in the 200 metres.

In 2000 in Sydney, Australia, Târlea earned her place again in the finals of the 400 m hurdles event, and came sixth. In 2002, she reaped gold at the European Championships held in Munich, also in the 400 m hurdles, her preferred event. A rather uneventful period followed for Târlea.:It was only in early 2008 that she secured her comeback among the world's top athletes as she came third in the 400 m event held in Stuttgart's Sparkassen Cup. She retired in April 2009, due to long-term injuries.

At club level Târlea competed for Dinamo Bucharest, Fenerbahçe Istanbul and Sporting Portugal athletics.

Achievements

References

External links

  Tirlea de argint!

1976 births
Living people
Sportspeople from Craiova
Romanian female hurdlers
Romanian female sprinters
Romanian expatriate sportspeople in Turkey
Olympic athletes of Romania
Athletes (track and field) at the 1996 Summer Olympics
Athletes (track and field) at the 2004 Summer Olympics
Athletes (track and field) at the 2008 Summer Olympics
Olympic silver medalists for Romania
European Athletics Championships medalists
Fenerbahçe athletes
Medalists at the 2004 Summer Olympics
Olympic silver medalists in athletics (track and field)
Universiade medalists in athletics (track and field)
Universiade gold medalists for Romania
World Athletics Indoor Championships winners
World Athletics Indoor Championships medalists
Medalists at the 1995 Summer Universiade
Medalists at the 1999 Summer Universiade
Romanian expatriate sportspeople in Portugal